The Tile classification is a system of categorizing pelvic fractures based on fracture pattern, allowing judgment on the stability of the pelvic ring.

Classification

See also
Young-Burgess classification

References

Pelvic fracture classifications
Injuries of abdomen, lower back, lumbar spine and pelvis